Devon Labour Briefing was a magazine established in Exeter, England, in 1984 by left-wing Labour Party members modelled on London Labour Briefing.

Origins 

Exeter Labour Briefing, the forerunner of Devon Labour Briefing (established 1984), was founded in the autumn of 1983. One source of support was the left-wing of the Exeter Pennsylvania/St. Davids branch of the Exeter Labour Party. Following the banning of articles critical of the Party in the branch newsletter, left-wingers decided to set up a publication independent of the Party. A key source of support was Exeter University Labour Club, several of whose members became active participants. Briefing supporters were also in a majority in the Exeter Labour Party Young Socialists, (one of the few branches not controlled by the Militant tendency at that time.) A handful of supporters developed in other Exeter Labour Party branches Rougemont/St. Leonards branch (the City Centre) and Polsloe/Stoke Hill.

Political orientation 

Though Devon Labour Briefing was associated with a London-based national organisation, the focus of its politics was very much the Exeter Labour Party. Briefing accused the city party of being authoritarian, non-socialist, racist and sexist. The local Labour leadership and councillors were deemed 'municipal careerists' who sought status and respectability rather than advancing socialist causes. These intra-Labour Party themes featured prominently in the magazine. 
In 1984, Labour won control of Exeter City Council in coalition with the Liberal/SDP Alliance and later the Liberal Democrats. Devon Labour Briefing was critical of this coalition. When the Labour candidate in the St. Leonards by-election stood down in favour of the Liberal Democrats (contrary to national Labour Party policy), Devon Labour Briefing campaigned for the Green Party.
In the UK miners' strike, Devon Labour Briefing twinned itself with the Maerdy Colliery in South Wales, and collected money and food.
Supporters of Devon Labour Briefing were elected to leading positions in the Exeter Anti-Apartheid Movement after bitter disputes with some Labour Party and Communist Party members.
Devon Labour Briefing supporters participated in the Exeter Campaign for Nuclear Disarmament, which peaked at nearly 2500 local members in the 1980s Briefing had little influence but aligned its votes with those of members of the Green Party
In 1987, Devon Labour Briefing joined with the leadership of the East Devon Labour Party to set up the East Devon Socialist Campaign Group. The main focus of the group was to back the 1988 national leadership bid of Tony Benn MP and Eric Heffer MP. Though the group made limited headway across the region, the exclusive Labour Party orientation of East Devon Labour Party members was often at odds with the more radical approach of Devon Labour Briefing.
Devon Labour Briefing supporters were in involved in the Exeter Marxist Reading Group, run by the Workers Revolutionary Party. The group sought to relate the texts of classical Marxism to contemporary politics.
In the autumn, Devon Labour Briefing organised a socialist Day School in Exeter. Speakers and workshop moderators were invited from London Labour Briefing and elsewhere.

Legal action against the Labour Party 

Exeter Labour Briefing, the forerunner of Devon Labour Briefing, began publication in the autumn of 1983. The leadership of Exeter Labour Party almost immediately took disciplinary against the publication on the grounds that the magazine might be confused with an Exeter Labour Party publication. The dispute was temporarily resolved with the magazine being renamed Devon Labour Briefing, following the intervention of Tony Benn MP, a member of the National Executive Committee.

In 1985, the leadership resumed disciplinary action against the editors of the magazine on the grounds that the magazine was 'prejudicial to interests of the Party.' The leadership interrogated five writers and three were recommended for expulsion from the Labour Party. Before the Management Committee of Exeter Labour Party could decide the issue, the three obtained a High Court injunction stopping the expulsion process as the whole expulsion process seriously breached the rules of natural justice. After initially stating that they would contest the action, the Labour Party withdrew from the case making them liable for court costs.

In 1987, Exeter Labour Party again began disciplinary action against one person involved with the magazine through the newly formed Labour Party National Constitutional Committee. After a day-long hearing in Exeter the contributor concerned received a formal warning but was not expelled.

The William of Orange celebrations 1988 

In 1988, the Labour-controlled Exeter City Council in collaboration with the William and Mary Tercentenary Trust planned to celebrate the so-called Glorious Revolution of 1688 on the grounds that Exeter was the first English city in which William III of England set foot. The National Front, the Orange Order and other right wing groups announced that they too would participate in the celebrations. Devon Labour Briefing opposed the celebrations inside the Labour Party on the grounds that William of Orange was a symbol of Protestant supremacy in Northern Ireland, that the Glorious Revolution did not involve working people and that the celebrations were acting as a magnet for the extreme right. Although Devon Labour Briefing and other left-wingers won the vote in Exeter Labour Party, the City Council persisted. Key invited figures such as the historian Christopher Hill, however, backed out of the celebrations. The events of 1988 saw the launching of Exeter Anti-Fascist Action, affiliated to Anti-Fascist Action nationally and included supporters of Devon Labour Briefing and the Workers Revolutionary Party, as well as other independent socialists and anarchists.

Demise  
After Labour's defeat in the 1987 general election, Neil Kinnock, leader of the Labour Party, began a policy review, which sought to change Labour Party policies (e.g., abandonment unilateral nuclear disarmament). Labour Briefing was facing defeat and marginalisation. In the summer of 1989, Devon Labour Briefing supporters ceased to play a role in Exeter Labour Party; either through defeat in internal party elections or through resignation. The majority abandoned active party politics; a minority joined the Workers Revolutionary Party and later the Socialist Alliance.

Defunct political magazines published in the United Kingdom
Democratic socialism
Exeter
Labour Party (UK) publications
Magazines established in 1984
Magazines with year of disestablishment missing
Politics of Devon
Socialist magazines
1984 establishments in the United Kingdom